Ice Palace Salavat Yulaev is an indoor sporting arena located in Ufa, Russia. The capacity of the arena is 4,043.  It was the home arena of the Salavat Yulaev Ufa ice hockey team. It was replaced by Ufa Arena in 2007.

Along with Ufa Arena, Ice Palace Salavat Yulaev played host to games in the 2013 World Junior Ice Hockey Championships taking place between December 26, 2012 and January 5, 2013.

References

Buildings and structures completed in 1967
Indoor ice hockey venues in Russia
Indoor arenas in Russia
Salavat Yulaev Ufa
Buildings and structures in Ufa
Sports venues in Bashkortostan
Cultural heritage monuments of regional significance in Bashkortostan